RGB Entertainment is a production company from Argentina. It was established in the year 2000.

History 
It was created in 2000 by Gustavo Yankelevich, former Telefe director, and Victor Gonzalez, with headquarters in Buenos Aires, Argentina and Sao Paulo, Brazil. It include creation and production of television shows, films, CDs, live events and multitudinous events.

The company co-produces all Cris Morena productions alongside Cris Morena Group since 2004. Projects together includes two cinematographic releases (Erreway: 4 Caminos and Chiquititas: Rincon de luz, based on TV shows Rebelde Way and Chiquititas), six TV shows (Floricienta, Amor Mio, Casi Angeles, Alma Pirata, Chiquititas 2006, ByB), seven live musicals (Floricienta in 2004 and 2005, Chiquititas in 2006, Casi Angeles in 2007, 2008 and 2009 and the Argentine production of Spring Awakening for 2010) and three unreleased projects (Blake & Jake, produced for the international market, cell-phone novela Atr@pados and Niños de Cristal). Other projects with Cris includes Internet channel yups.tv and the store Fans Store.

The products of this company are shown in the most important channels in Spain, Portugal, Mexico, Brazil, Chile, Venezuela, Uruguay and Israel.

RGB Entertainment managed the Disney Channel in Latin America from 2002 to 2005. It also manages Radio Disney in Argentina, Chile, Paraguay and Uruguay and all the Disney on Ice and Disney on Stage productions in South America (including Brazil). It also produces all Latin American versions Playhouse Disney (Mexico, Argentina and Brazil) and also all the European versions, including the Italian, British and Spanish versions. The company also produced the reality High School Musical A Seleção for the Brazilian market (in Argentina it was produced by Ideas de Sur).

RGB's first highly successful production was the Argentina version of Australian reality show Popstars. It was so successful, the company got the rights to produce the shows in all Latin America. It produced versions in Brazil and Mexico and managed all the bands formed in the show, including Bandana, Rouge, Br'oz and Mambrú.

Soap operas 
Casi Angeles (Almost Angels) - 2007 - 2010
Chiquititas (Tiny Angels) - 2006
Alma Pirata (Pirate Soul) - 2006
Floricienta - 2004 - 2005
Amor Mio (My Love) - 2005
Jake & Blake - 2009 - 2010

(all co-produced with Cris Morena Group and created by Cris Morena).

Novelettes
Arbre toes Josh (DECORATION) - 2003
Karachi - 2002 ESCALATE DEPORTATIONS 
Provocative - 2001 ACCORDION EN LA DENTIST
Novelette Bare la coca Open your Eyes Karachi Carissa
Provo came - 2001
Karachi eel show DE aux

Talk Show 
Somos como somos (We are what we are) - 2004

Entertainment 
Sabelotodo (You know everything) - 2005 
Blef - 2005

Reality Shows 
Escalera a la fama (''Upstairs to the Fame) - 2003
Popstars (in Argentina, Brazil, Mexico and Colombia)
The Amazing Race en Discovery Channel (Season 1 only) - 2009

External links 
 

Mass media companies established in 2000
Television production companies of Argentina